Welcome 2 was a concert tour by American recording artist Prince. Playing over 80 shows, the tour reached North America, Europe, and Australia. Each leg of the tour was branded with the "Welcome 2" title followed by the continent in which the leg was located. The tour marked the singer's first performances in North America in over six years. The show was composed of the singer performing his hits with his band The New Power Generation. Alongside Prince, various musicians performed including Janelle Monáe, Esperanza Spalding, and Cassandra Wilson. The tour placed 39th on Pollstar's "Top 50 Worldwide Tour", earning nearly $20 million.

Background
Prince announced the tour on October 14, 2010 at the famed Apollo Theater in New York City. He stated the tour would begin in Greater New York. He further explained to the audience each show would be different. "Come early, come often. I have a lot of hits... no two shows will be the same". For the tour, Prince played a custom gold Fender Stratocaster (made by the Fender Custom Shop), which was auctioned off at the end of the tour. The proceed benefited the Harlem Children's Zone.

The concerts were staged in the round, with the stage shaped like the singer's iconic love symbol. During shows, Prince invited several celebrities to come onstage and "jam out" with him, including Naomi Campbell, Whoopi Goldberg, Jamie Foxx, Alicia Keys, Leighton Meester, Questlove, Sherri Shepherd, Whitney Houston, and Cornel West. He also performed duets with specials guests throughout the shows in North America. For "The Beautiful Ones", Prince was joined onstage by ballet dancer Misty Copeland. During the concert at Madison Square Garden on December 29, 2010, Janelle Monáe performed "If I Was Your Girlfriend" with the singer. During the same show, Cyndi Lauper and Egypt Sherrod performed "Jungle Love".

Following his shows in Greater New York, Prince expanded the tour to include the San Francisco Bay Area and The Carolinas. In April, he announced he would perform a twenty-one night residency show at The Forum in Inglewood, California, during an appearance on Lopez Tonight. Dubbed "Welcome 2 America: 21-Night Stands", the singer performed throughout the months of April and May, including stops in Fresno, San Jose, and Sacramento. As the tour continued, Prince performed at several music festivals in Europe. In the fall of 2011, he announced he would bring his tour to Canada, his first performances in the territory in nearly ten years. In 2012, a tour of Australia received a warm response from spectators.

Opening acts

Lalah Hathaway (East Rutherford—December 15, Greenville, North Charleston)
Esperanza Spalding (East Rutherford—December 15)
Maceo Parker (East Rutherford—December 17)
Cassandra Wilson (East Rutherford—December 17)
Graham Central Station (New York City—December 18, Oakland, Fresno, San Jose, Sacramento)
Sinbad (New York City—December 18)
Janelle Monáe (New York City—December 29)
Mint Condition (New York City—December 29, Columbia)
Sharon Jones & The Dap-Kings (New York City—January 18)
Cee Lo Green (New York City—February 2)
Sheila E. (Oakland, Fresno, San Jose, Sacramento)
Anthony Hamilton (Charlotte)
Chaka Khan (Raleigh, Greensboro)

Setlist

{{hidden
| headercss = background: #ccccff; font-size: 100%; width: 65%;
| contentcss = text-align: left; font-size: 100%; width: 75%;
| header = California
| content =February 23, 2011
"Let's Go Crazy"
"Delirious"
"1999"
"Little Red Corvette"
"The Glamorous Life" (contains elements of  "Soul Sacrifice") (performed with Sheila E.)
"Somewhere Here on Earth"
"I Love U, but I Don't Trust U Anymore"
"Controversy" (contains elements of "Batdance")
"Play That Funky Music"
"A Love Bizarre" (performed with Sheila E.)
Medley: "Sexy Dancer" / "Le Freak" / "Love Rollercoaster"
"Controversy" (Reprise) (contains excerpts from "Housequake")
"If I Was Your Girlfriend"
"Kiss"
"Purple Rain"
Encore
"Dance (Disco Heat)" (Instrumental Interlude)
"Baby I'm a Star"
Medley: "When Doves Cry" / "Nasty Girl" / "Sign '☮' the Times" / "Alphabet St."
"My Love Is Forever"
"Darling Nikki" (Instrumental Interlude)
"Pop Life" (contains excerpts from "Single Ladies (Put a Ring on It)")
"Black Sweat"
"Jungle Love"

April 14, 2011
"D.M.S.R."
"Pop Life"
"Extraordinary"
Medley: "Uptown" / "Raspberry Beret" / "Cream"
"Cool" (contains elements of "Don't Stop 'Til You Get Enough")
"Let's Work"
"U Got the Look"
"Purple Rain"
"Let's Go Crazy"
"Delirious"
"1999"
"The Beautiful Ones"
"Little Red Corvette"
"Kiss"
Medley: "When Doves Cry" / "Nasty Girl" / "Sign '☮' the Times" / "Darling Nikki" (Instrumental Interlude) / "777-9311"
"Single Ladies (Put a Ring on It)" (Instrumental Interlude)
"If I Was Your Girlfriend"
"Insatiable"
"Scandalous!"
"Adore"
"A Love Bizarre" (performed with Sheila E.)
Encore
"Play That Funky Music"
"Controversy" (contains excerpts from "Housequake")
"The Glamorous Life" (contains elements of  "Soul Sacrifice") (performed with Sheila E.)
"Peach" (performed with Sheila E.)
"Dance (Disco Heat)"
"Baby I'm a Star"
"Stratus" (Instrumental Interlude)
Medley: "Sometimes It Snows in April" / "Laydown" / "Endorphinmachine" / "She's Always in My Hair" / "Dreamer"
"Welcome 2 America"
}}
{{hidden
| headercss = background: #ccccff; font-size: 100%; width: 65%;
| contentcss = text-align: left; font-size: 100%; width: 75%;
| header = The Carolinas
| content =March 24, 2011
Medley: "When Doves Cry" / "Nasty Girl" / "Darling Nikki" (Instrumental Interlude) / "Sign '☮' the Times" / "777-9311" / "The Most Beautiful Girl in the World"
"Uptown"
"Raspberry Beret"
"Cream"
"Cool" (contains elements of "Don't Stop 'Til You Get Enough")
"Let's Work"
"U Got the Look"
"Nothing Compares 2 U"
"Take Me with U"
"Anotherloverholenyohead"
"Controversy" (contains elements of "Batdance")
"Play That Funky Music"
"Which Way Is Up?"
"Controversy" (Reprise) (contains excerpts from "Housequake")
"I Want to Be Free"
"Shhh"
"The Beautiful Ones"
"Diamonds and Pearls"
"Something in the Water (Does Not Compute)"
"How Come U Don't Call Me Anymore?"
"If I Was Your Girlfriend"
"Kiss"
"Purple Rain"
Encore
"Dance (Disco Heat)"
"Baby I'm a Star"
}}

Tour dates

Festivals and other miscellaneous performances

Cancellations and rescheduled shows

Box office score data

Notes
1.The annual Pollstar ranking of the concert industry's top performing artists is tabulated for all worldwide shows, worked between January 1 and June 30, 2011. All ticket sales figures are calculated in U.S. dollars and are based on reported information and extensive research by Pollstar.

References

Prince (musician) concert tours
2010 concert tours
2011 concert tours
2012 concert tours